Dózsa György út is a station on the Budapest Metro Line 3 (North-South). It is located beneath Váci Avenue at its intersection with the eponymous street Dózsa György út. The station was opened on 7 November 1984 as part of the extension from Lehel tér to Árpád híd.

Connections
Trolleybus: 75, 79M

References

M3 (Budapest Metro) stations
Railway stations opened in 1984